Parikh  is a name found among Hindus of the Bania caste and also Jains. In means assayer in the Gujarati language and has its roots in the Sanskrit word for examiner. Both the Oswal and Porwal communities of India have clans called Parekh.

People bearing the name, who may or may not be affiliated with the above communities, include:
 Shrenu Parikh, Indian television actress.
 Narhari Parikh, Indian freedom fighter and social reformer
 Rahul Parikh, American pediatrician
 Rasiklal Chhotalal Parikh, Gujarati writer, Poet, and Indologist
 Rohit Jivanlal Parikh, Indian-American mathematician and logician
 Himanshu Parikh, Indian architect
 Jayant Parikh, Indian Painter, Printmaker, and Muralist
 Vasant Parikh, Indian politician and social worker
 Deepak Parikh, CEO of Clariant Chemicals India
 Tej Parikh, former Chief Economist, Institute of Directors

References

Social groups of Gujarat